Rokšped d.o.o is a multi-million company located in Podgorica, Montenegro. Its businesses include selling petrol, automobiles (mainly advertising Volkswagens) and distributing cigarettes. It has mainly gained popularity by selling automobiles, only selling Volkswagens and Audis, thus creating and running "Volkswagen of Montenegro" and "Audi of Montenegro". The company was founded and named by entrepreneur Roko Stanaj, and is currently owned by his sons: Nuo,Ljubo,Anton,Vaso,Sander and Simon Stanaj,all members of the executive board.

Subsidiaries 
Hotel Galeb Ulcinj
P.P. Erdevik - wines
Rokšped Auto Centar - automobiles, Volkswagen and Audi dealership
Rokšped Distributivni Centar - cigarette distribution
Rokšped Rent-a-car, able to rent only Volkswagen vehicles
Rokšped Špedicija - trucking
Tobacco-S-Press - made up of kiosks and small gift shops mainly oriented toward cigarette sales.
S-Press - distribution and sale of printing
Štampa AD - retail chain of newsstand
Home Depo - Italian ceramic and granite tiles, sanitary ware, bathroom furniture, laminate flooring, doors, kitchen and construction materials

External links
Official website
Volkswagen of Montenegro
Audi of Montenegro

Conglomerate companies of Montenegro